The EOS 1D Mark II is a professional 8.2 megapixel digital single lens reflex camera (DSLR) camera body produced by Canon. The EOS 1D Mark II was the successor of the EOS 1D and was itself replaced by the Canon EOS-1D Mark III in 2007. It was Canon's first dual-card slot EOS camera with one CF slot and one SD slot that was meant easily to use two dominant card types and have a assurance that once a small sized primary and faster CF slot is full, camera can be used to take photographs when recording was continued on secondary and slower card in critical moment. It also now had wireless capabilities. When paired with the new Canon WFT-E1, you could transfer images to a PC using an FTP server.

Features
The EOS 1D Mark II features:
 28.7 × 19.1 mm CMOS sensor
 8.2 megapixel effective (8.5 megapixel total)
 DIGIC II image processor
 Canon EF lens mount (excludes EF-S)
 1.3x crop factor
 45-point TTL-AREA-SIR autofocus with a dedicated CMOS sensor
 TTL full aperture metering with 21 zone SPC
 100–1600 ISO speed equivalent (ISO can be expanded to L: 50 or H: 3200 with custom function)
 30–1/8000 sec. shutter speed and bulb
 Auto white balance
 Eye-level pentaprism viewfinder with approx. 100% coverage
 230,000 pixel, 2.0" color TFT liquid-crystal monitor with approx. 100% coverage (for JPEG images)
 E-TTL II flash mode
 8.5 frames per second continuous shooting (JPEG: max. 40 frames, raw: max. 20 frames)
 Dimensions (WxHxD): 156 × 158 × 80 mm (6.1 × 6.2 × 3.1 in)
 Weight (body only): Approx. 1220 g
 Battery: Canon NP-E3 NiMH: 12v 1650mAh 300 g
 Microphone for recording voice annotations
 Shutter lag 40ms

The camera's image sensor is a CMOS-based integrated circuit. It has approximately 8.5 million total pixel sensors in a Bayer filter pattern. A non-removable anti-aliasing filter (optical low-pass filter) is located in front of the image sensor.

The shutter is an electronically controlled focal-plane shutter. Its maximum speed is 1/8000 second. Soft-touch shutter release occurs via an electromagnetic signal.

EOS-1D Mark II N 

On August 22, 2005, Canon announced the successor to the EOS 1D Mark II.  The new Canon EOS-1D Mark II N features the same 8.2 megapixel CMOS sensor, DIGIC II image processor and 8.5 frame per second shooting speed of its predecessor.  The primary changes are a new 2.5" wide viewing angle LCD monitor, Evaluative Metering, an improved buffer, and new 'Picture Style' image parameters.

Users
Director Tim Burton on the stop-motion animation film Corpse Bride (2005)
James Nachtwey
Phil Martin

Gallery

See also
Canon EOS
Canon EF lens mount

References

External links

 Canon EOS-1D Mark II page at Canon USA
 Picture Style.

1D Mark II